Adhyavasāya (Sanskrit: अध्यवसाय ) generally means – 'apprehension', 'clinging to', 'mental effort'  and also 'perseverance', 'having decided'.

Vedic interpretation
Nārāyana Tīrtha, in his Sāmkhya-Candrikā, explains adhyavasāya as " a modified condition of the intellect (buddhi) the determination in such a form as – such an act is to be done by me ". Gaudapāda explains it as " intellectual determination of the object of perception as belonging to a definite class ". Vācaspatimiśra explains it as " ascertainment or determinate knowledge consequent upon the manifestation of the essence (sattva) of the intellect, when the inertia of the intellect is overcome by the operation of the sense-organs in apprehending their objects, as the intention which follows self-appropriated knowledge or volition of the agent to react to the object of perception in a definite way ". Ascertainment also means definite awareness which according to the Samkhya school is associated in buddhi (अध्यवसायो बुद्धिः), in perception which is definite ascertainment involving the senses with respect to specific kinds of empirical objects, and which is an activity of buddhi. It implies determination of objects (avidhāranā) which by itself is decisive knowledge (niścaya).

The sage of the Maitri Upanishad (VI.30) explains:-

 स हि सर्वकाममयः पुरुषोऽध्यवसायसङ्कल्पाभिमानलिङ्गो बद्धः | अतस्तद्विपरीतो मुक्तः ||

 " The purusha full of kama or desire is bound having adhyavasaya, sankalpa and abhimana as his lingas (characteristics) ; he who is 
the opposite of this is liberated. "

Vindhyāvasin holds the view that sankalpa, abhimāna and adhyavasāya are not different functions but the modifications of the mind or intellect. Samkhyas hold the view that perception is the reflective discerning (adhyavasāya), a kind of awareness, an operation of the intellect in its sattva modality; to be aware of perception as perception is to define and distinguish it from others which definition (adhyavasāya) can come only through conception (vikalpa). Sadyojyoti defines discernment as the ascertaining cognitive activity (adhyavasāya) which is understanding (jñāna).

Yoga interpretation

According to the Yoga school and Ayurveda, adhyavasāya i.e. apprehension of clear and clean knowledge of the knowable, is one of the sixteen qualities of the empirical soul (jīvātmān). Lakshmi Tantra (XVI.4) explains that the intellect (buddhi) is the incentive to mental effort (adhyavasāya); prana is the incentive to endeavour (prayatna) and time (kāla) is the incentive to transform in the form of impulse and effective development; whereas ego (ahamkara) results from a modification of mahat  in which cognition is indeterminate cognition (nirvikalpa adhyavasāya).

Jaina and Buddhist interpretation

The followers of Jainism consider adhyavasāya referring to good or bad sentiments, and of the nature of Bhava-Yoga which is made up of 'inauspicious combined meditation' and 'meditation'. Utpala in his following statement:-

मायाशक्त्या विभोः सैव भिन्नसंवेद्यगोचरा |
कथिका ज्ञानसंकल्पाध्यवसायादिनामभिः ||

terms - adhyavasāya as mental apprehension as he  proceeds to explain māyā-shakti to be the differentiating power of Brahman that affects consciousness resulting in the false perception of duality. And, Ratnakīrti holds the view that non-momentary existence is a figment of imaginative intuition projected as real by the process of intellection called adhyavasāya which is impulsive movement of the mind generated by the force of immediately preceding cognition. The Buddhist view is that the judgment of the object of cognition ('spatio-temporal objects') owing to special synthesis of moments gains sensible qualities etc., to become universal (sāmānaya lakshana, ekatva adhyavasāya). Jñanasrimitra holds the view that only deluded persons interpret an image by conceptual thinking. (adhyavasāya, vikalpa).

Adhyavasāya in Sanskrit literature

Common characteristics (sādhāranadharma) in poetry can either be in the form of existence (bhāva) or negation (abhāva), and can involve supersession (adhyavasāya). In apahnuti (concealment of truth, denial), when a thing is concealed and something else is described in its place, the āropa (raising, elevating, superimposition) that is based on negation amounts to adhyavasāya, which view is refuted by Jayaratha who agrees with Ruyyaka that adhyavasāya is the phenomenon where the visayah is concealed and its non-difference (abheda)  with the vishayin is known, and that doubt (bhrānti) is always based on adhyavasāya and not on āropa. In Sanskrit literature, Alankāraśāstra deals with the beauty which poetry (kāvya) alone can display. Adhyavasāya is considered as siddha (accomplished) when the object is not expressed in words but is lost in comparison, it is considered as sādhya (perfect) when the object in the process of being represented is identical with the object of comparison. It distinguishes utprekśa ('alliteration') and atiśayokti ('hyperbole') from rūpaka ('dramatic representation', 'form') and āropa ('superimposition').

References

Philosophical schools and traditions
Hindu philosophical concepts
Buddhist philosophical concepts
Jain philosophical concepts
History of logic
Sanskrit literature
!
Vedas
Vedanta